Marakkanam is a coastal panchayat town & Taluk in Viluppuram district in the Indian state of Tamil Nadu. It is well connected to the state capital Chennai and the nearby union territory of Puducherry by the East Coast Road.  To the west, Marakkanam is connected to the town of Tindivanam by the SH-134. Marakkanam is situated on the declared National Waterways NW-4. On materialisation of National Waterways NW-4, Marakkanam will be connected to two states Andhra Pradesh (Kakinada) and Puducherry through north and south of Buckingham Canal.

History
Marakkanam was connected to Vijayawada in Andhra Pradesh through the Buckingham Canal, a 420 km long fresh water navigation canal. The 110-km stretch from Marakkanam to Chennai is called South Buckingham Canal.  The canal connects most of the natural backwaters along the coast to the port of Chennai (Madras). It was constructed by the British Raj, and was an important waterway during the late nineteenth and the twentieth century. Canal was formerly used to convey goods up and down, but later the usage has downgraded due to industrial pollution of  water. 

In 2013, a violent clash occurred in this town on the basis of caste, in which two people died.

Administration
Indian Postal code for Marakkanam is 604303.

Marakkanam panchayat town was divided into 56 Village Panchayats.The following are the Village Panchayats under Marakkanam

Adasal	
Adavallikoothan
Alankuppam
Alapakkam
Alathur
Annamputhur
Anumandai
Asappur
Athur
Brammadesam
Chettikuppam
Cheyyankuppam
Ekkiyarkuppam
Endiyur
Endur
Eraiyanur
kazhikuppam
Jaggampettai
Kandadu	
Kattalai
kaippani nagar
Kilarungunam
Kiledaiyalam
Kilpettai
Kilputhuppattu
Kilsithamur
Kilsiviri
Kolathur
Koonimedu
Kovadi
Kurur
Manur
Molasur
Munnur
Nadukuppam
K.N Palayam
pudhuppakkam
Kandadu
Nagalpakkam
Nagar
Nallalam.t
Nallur
Nalmukkal
mandur
Omippair
Panichamedu
Perumukkal
Pudhupakkam.m
Salavadi
Singanur
Thenkalavaii
Thennerkunam
Thenpasar
Urani
Vada Nerkunam
Vadaalappakkam
Vadakottippakkam
Vaidappakkam
Vannippair
Vengai
Vittalapuram
Siruvadi

Demographics
 India census, Marakkanam had a population of 19,153. Males constitute 50% of the population and females 50%. Marakkanam has an average literacy rate of 61%, higher than the national average of 59.5%: male literacy is 70%, and female literacy is 52%. In Marakkanam, 13% of the population is under 6 years of age.

Economy

Salt Production (Largest Salt Production Happening Next to Tuticorin in every year)
Fishing
Agriculture

Schools
 Government Higher Secondary School
 Government Girls High School
 Sri Ramakrishna Matriculation School
 St.Joseph's Primary School (R.C.Primary School)
 Panchayat Union Elementary School
 ALM Matriculation School
 Bharathiyar Matric Higher Secondary school
 J.M.J. Matriculation and Higher l Secondary School
 Good shepherd primary school
 chanakiya vidhyasharam cbsc school

Hospitals
Government Hospital, Marakkanam (Near ECR bypass)

Road Connectivity
34 km from Tindivanam. It is well connected to the  Tindivanam.
 All the buses plying through ECR  via Kovalam, Mamallapuram, Kadapakkam Chennai to Pondicherry are connected to Marakkanam.
 Connected to Chennai and Pondicherry with government bus No 83A  via Chengalpattu, Madhuranthagam, Soonambedu, Asappur, Allathur
 Connected to Chennai and Marakkanam with government bus No 188A  via Kovalam, Mamallapuram, Kalpakkam, Kadapakkam
 Connected to Chennai and Cuddalore with government bus No 162  via Chengalpattu, Madhuranthagam, Soonambedu, Allathur

Adjacent communities

References

External links

Cities and towns in Viluppuram district